Shingling was a stage in the production of bar iron or steel, in the finery and puddling processes.  As with many ironmaking terms, this is derived from the French - cinglage.

The product of the finery was a bloom or loop (from old Frankish luppa or  lopp, meaning a shapeless mass); that of the puddling furnace was a puddled ball.  In each case, this needed to be consolidated by hammering it into a more regular shape.  This was done manually with heavy hammers; later by a waterwheel or steam powered hammers, leading to modern power hammers.  The result was an oblong-shaped iron product similar in appearance to shingles used on roofs. In the finery, this was part of the work of the finer; during puddling, it was done by a special workman called the shingler.  The iron (or steel) then had to be further shaped (drawn out) under the hammer or rolled in a rolling mill to produce a bar. In more recent times, the process was carried out using mechanical jaws to squeeze the puddled ball into shape.

References
 H. R. Schubert, History of the British iron and steel industry (1957), 285-6
 W. K. V. Gale, The iron and steel industry: a dictionary of terms (Newton Abbot, 1971), 184.

Metallurgical processes